Viceregal Lodge may refer to:
Residences of the Lord Lieutenant of Ireland
 Áras an Uachtaráin, Dublin (1780s–1922)
 Chapelizod House, County Dublin (1680s)
Residences of the Viceroy of India
 Rashtrapati Niwas, Shimla (1888)
 Rashtrapati Bhavan, New Delhi; "Viceroy's House" 1931–50
 Viceregal Lodge, New Delhi (1912 - 1931), now residence of Vice Chancellor, University of Delhi

See also
 Viceroy
 Official residence